The following is a list of players, both past and current, who appeared at least in one game for the Taoyuan Pauian Pilots (2020–present) franchise.



Players

A

B

C

D

G

H

J

K

L

P

R

S

T

W

References

P. League+ all-time rosters